David Robert Carry (born 8 October 1981) is a Scottish former competition swimmer who represented Great Britain in the Olympics, FINA world championships and the European championships, and Scotland in the Commonwealth Games. He competed internationally in freestyle and medley swimming events. He is the winner of seven medals in major international championships. He is of Scottish-Faroese ancestry.

He represented Scotland at the 2002, 2006 and 2010 Commonwealth Games.  In 2006 he won two golds in the 400-metre freestyle and 400-metre individual medley.

He attended Robert Gordon's College during his school years.  He represented Great Britain at the 2008 Summer Olympics in Beijing, competing the 400-metre freestyle and 4×200-metre freestyle relay swimming events. Four years later at the 2012 Summer Olympics in London, he swam in the 400-metre freestyle, and qualified for the finals with the time 3:47.25. His final result was seventh, with the time 3:48.62.  He was also a member of the British men's team in the 4×200-metre freestyle relay.

Carry retired from competitive swimming in October 2012. Following his retirement from swimming, he was performance director for his former sports management company, Red Sky Management, based in Edinburgh, as a business coach.

Carry along with heptathlete Jessica Ennis-Hill, boxer Nicola Adams, fellow swimmer Michael Jamieson and sprinter Allan Wells were ambassadors for Glasgow 2014 Commonwealth Games.

On 15 September 2012 at Craigiebuckler Church, Aberdeen, where generations of the Carry family have married, David and fellow swimmer Keri-Anne Payne were married. The couple had lived in Heywood, Greater Manchester. However, due to Carry's retirement from competitive swimming and in preparation for the 2014 Commonwealth Games in Glasgow, after their wedding they relocated to Edinburgh, where Payne joined Warrender Baths Club.

Personal bests and records

See also
 Commonwealth Games records in swimming
 List of Commonwealth Games medallists in swimming (men)

References

External links
British Swimming athlete profile
British Olympic Association athlete profile

1981 births
Living people
Alumni of Loughborough University
Commonwealth Games gold medallists for Scotland
Commonwealth Games silver medallists for Scotland
Commonwealth Games bronze medallists for Scotland
European Aquatics Championships medalists in swimming
Scottish male freestyle swimmers
Male medley swimmers
Medalists at the FINA World Swimming Championships (25 m)
Olympic swimmers of Great Britain
People educated at Robert Gordon's College
Scottish male swimmers
Sportspeople from Aberdeen
Swimmers at the 2002 Commonwealth Games
Swimmers at the 2004 Summer Olympics
Swimmers at the 2006 Commonwealth Games
Swimmers at the 2008 Summer Olympics
Swimmers at the 2010 Commonwealth Games
Swimmers at the 2012 Summer Olympics
Commonwealth Games medallists in swimming
Medallists at the 2006 Commonwealth Games
Medallists at the 2010 Commonwealth Games